Suerococha (possibly from Quechua suyru a very long dress tracked after when worn, qucha lake,) is a mountain in the west of the Huayhuash  mountain range in the Andes of Peru, about  high, and the name of a small lake near the mountain. The mountain is located in the Ancash Region, Bolognesi Province, Pacllon District. Suyruqucha lies on a sub-range west of Yerupaja, northwest of Huacrish and Auxilio and northeast of Rajucollota.

The mountain might have been named after a little lake southwest of it.

References

Mountains of Peru
Mountains of Ancash Region
Lakes of Peru
Lakes of Lima Region